Hak Ja Han (Korean: 한학자, Hanja: 韓鶴子) (born January 6, 1943, lunar calendar which is February 10, 1943, Gregorian) is a Korean religious leader. Her late husband Sun Myung Moon was the founder of the Unification movement, also known as the Unification Church (UC).  Han and Moon were married in April 1960 and have 10 living children and over 30 grandchildren. In 1992, she established the Women's Federation for World Peace, and traveled the world speaking on its behalf.  She is the leader of the Family Federation for World Peace and Unification, in which she is called "True Mother" and "Mother of Peace".

Personal life and family
Han, whose mother later became a follower of Sun Myung Moon, was born on January 6, 1943 (lunar calendar). Han attended an all-girls high school in Korea but did not go on to college. She speaks Japanese and English as well as Korean. In April 1960, at the age of 17, Han, by then a member of the Unification movement (which was officially founded in 1954), married Moon who was then 40 years old. 
Han has 14 children, 10 of whom are still living,  and as of 1993 had 20 grandchildren and 38 as of 2011. The children are: 
Ye Jin Moon (1960–) (daughter); 
Hyo Jin Moon (1962–2008) (son); 
Hae Jin Moon (1964–1964) (son); 
In Jin Moon (1965–) (daughter);
Heung Jin Moon (1966–1984) (son); 
Un Jin Moon (1967) (daughter); 
Hyun Jin Moon (1969–) (son); 
Kook Jin Moon (1970–) (son); 
Kwon Jin Moon (1970–) (son); 
Sun Jin Moon (1976–) (daughter); 
Young Jin Moon (1976–1999) (son); 
Hyung Jin Moon (1979–) (son); 
Yeon Jin Moon (1981–) (daughter); 
Jeung Jin Moon (1982–) (daughter).  
In Korean culture, as well as other East Asian cultures, a married woman keeps her original family name, with the children taking their father's.

On July 19, 2008, Han along with her husband and 14 others, including several of their children and grandchildren, were slightly injured when a Sikorsky S-92 helicopter owned by the movement crashed during an emergency landing and burst into flames in Gapyeong. Han and all 15 others were treated at the nearby movement-affiliated Cheongshim Hospital.

Role in the Unification movement
Unification members believe that Han and Moon's wedding established a "holy marriage" which Jesus was not able to establish, and also consider it to be a holy day, called "True Parents Day," as well as what members refer to as the "True Family." It is believed by the members to be the beginning of a new Completed Testament Age and to have fulfilled the prophesied Marriage of the Lamb in the Revelation of John.

According to Unification members, Han and Moon are together believed to be the new messiahs. The Moons are regarded by members to be the "True Parents" of humanity and are addressed by its followers as the True Father and True Mother. Members have also referred to Han as "the Bride of Christ" and the perfect woman. She is seen within the movement as the Mother of humankind, the final chosen of God. Han and Moon are also seen as the exemplars of the God-centered existence by  members. In Unification services, members bow down in respect for Moon and Han, when they are present, and to representative pictures of them when they are not.

In 1962, Moon and Han founded the Little Angels Children’s Folk Ballet of Korea, a girls Korean folk ballet company meant to promote a positive perception of South Korea. In 1984, Han spoke at a Unification movement sponsored academic conference in Washington, D.C. to a crowd of 240 which included professors from Harvard, Princeton, Stanford, University of Michigan and the Sorbonne in Paris.

In 1993, U.S. Senator Trent Lott supported the bill True Parents Day in the U.S. Senate and in 1995 U.S. President Bill Clinton signed a bill into law called Parents Day; according to this law, children are to honor their parents on this day. This showed the relationship of the Unification movement to the Republican and Democrat Parties of the United States, according to news media. In 1993, U.S. Senator Orrin Hatch introduced Han to a crowd at Capitol Hill; she stated at the event that she and Moon are the first True Parents.  Moon was in the audience watching her speech, along with members of the United States Senate and United States House of Representatives.

Wedding ceremonies

Han and Moon together presided over the mass wedding ceremonies  for which the Unification movement is noted. (See: Blessing ceremony of the Unification Church.) In 1997, they donned crowns and gold-trimmed robes to lead a mass wedding and marriage rededication ceremony in Washington, D.C. for 20,000 couples, 2,500 of them Unification members whose marriages had been arranged by Moon.  Ministers of other religions acted as "co-officiators."  In 1997, Han presided with her husband over a marriage affirmation ceremony for 28,000 couples, some married and some newly engaged, in New York City. During the ceremony Han and Moon sprinkled holy water on the couples.

Women's Federation for World Peace
In 1992, Han established the Women's Federation for World Peace (WFWP) with the support of many Unification members, and traveled the world speaking at conventions on its behalf. The WFWP's purpose is to encourage women to work more actively in promoting peace in their communities and greater society, and it includes 143 member countries. Han organized a conference in Tokyo in 1993, which was the first anniversary of the WFWP. The keynote speaker was former Vice President of the United States Dan Quayle's wife Marilyn Tucker Quayle, and in a speech at the event Han spoke positively of Mrs. Quayle's humanitarian work.

In 1993, Han traveled to 20 cities in the United States promoting WFWP, as well as to 12 countries. At a stop in Salt Lake City, Utah she told attendants: "If a family is not centered on God's ideal of love, there will be conflict among the members of that family. Without God's love as an absolute center, such a family will ultimately break down. A nation of such families will also decline." Her 1993 speeches in the United States focused on increasing violence in the U.S., and the degradation of the family unit.

In 1995, Han spoke at a WFWP event in Japan with former United States president George H. W. Bush. Han spoke after Bush's speech and praised Bush, crediting him for the decline of communism and saying that he must save America from "the destruction of the family and moral decay."

Family Federation for World Peace
In 1996, Han went on a world tour, speaking on behalf of the Family Federation for World Peace. Her speeches were given in cities across the United States, as well as countries including Korea, Japan, Italy, and 16 other countries in South America and Central America. In July 1996 she spoke at the Family Federation for World Peace's Inaugural World Convention at the National Building Museum in Washington, D.C. Han's closing address, called the "Founder's Address", was the climax of the proceedings.

Coronation ceremony
On March 23, 2004, Moon and Han were honored at an Ambassadors for Peace awards banquet held by the Interreligious and International Federation for World Peace (which is sponsored by the Unification movement) in a United States federal office building in Washington, D.C. It was called a "Crown of Peace" ceremony. At the event Moon stated that he was the Messiah. Over 12 United States lawmakers were in attendance. The event was criticized by some as a possible violation of the principle of separation of church and state in the United States.

Universal Peace Federation
In 2006, Han spoke in New Zealand on behalf of the Universal Peace Federation and called for traditional families, religious and cross-cultural tolerance, and a "peace tunnel" across the Bering Strait (Bering Strait crossing) connecting Russia and the United States.  In 2019 she spoke at a rally in Japan and called for greater understanding and cooperation between the Pacific Rim nations. In 2020 Han spoke at a UPF sponsored in-person and virtual rally for Korean unification which drew about one million attendees.

Increasing influence
In 1992, Moon increased Han's position of authority within the Unification movement and announced "True Mother was elevated to True Father's level horizontally." Hak Ja Han has been Moon's successor, designated as leader of the movement since 1993. Massimo Introvigne of the Center for Studies on New Religions writes in The Unification Church (2000):

The issue of succession is now of fundamental importance. The Reverend Moon will be eighty years old (by Korean age calculations, he turned eighty in 1999) in 2000. Mrs. Moon is fifty-seven years old. Since 1992 she has taken a more visible role, particularly in three world speaking tours in 1992, 1993, and 1999. Mrs. Moon has also spoken on Capitol Hill, at the United Nations, and in other parliaments around the world. Her relative youth and the respect with which she is held by the membership may be a point of stability for the Unification movement.Massimo Introvigne, From the Unification Church to the Unification Movement, 1994–1999: Five Years of Dramatic Changes (1999) Center for Studies on New Religions.

George D. Chryssides writes in Exploring New Religions (2001) that Han's importance with the movement continues to grow. Chryssides predicted that she would lead it and preside over blessing ceremonies after Moon's death, since she would then be "the remaining True Parent."

In 2003, over 8,000 Unification  members attended a ceremony in South Korea in which Han and Moon were remarried. This was said to be the fulfillment of the Marriage Supper of the Lamb written about in the Apocalypse of John.  In 2010 National Public Radio reported that Unification Church services in the United States invoked the name of Han along with Moon in their opening greetings to congregants. In that same year, Forbes reported that Han was living in South Korea with her husband while their children took more responsibility for the day-to-day leadership of the Unification Movement and its affiliated organizations. After Sun Myung Moon's death in 2012, Han became the leader of the Family Federation for World Peace and Unification, although she has faced some criticism from within the church community.

References

External links

The Birth and Childhood of Hak Ja Han Moon  at website of Family Federation for World Peace and Unification in Oceania
Speeches of Mrs. Hak Ja Han Moon, at www.unification.net
Biography of Mrs. Hak Ja Han Moon , at www.reverendsunmyungmoon.org
 at Legacy of Love

South Korean Unificationists
1943 births
Living people
People from South Pyongan
South Korean religious leaders
20th-century South Korean women
21st-century South Korean women